Cristiano Monguzzi (born 31 August 1985) is an Italian former racing cyclist.

Major results

2007
 7th Trofeo Banca Popolare di Vicenza
2008
 7th Trofeo Franco Balestra
2010
 10th Trofeo Zsšdi
2011
 1st Piccolo Giro di Lombardia
2013
 1st Stage 10 Vuelta al Táchira
 7th Overall Tour of Japan
 8th Overall Tour de Kumano
2015
 10th Tour de Berne

References

External links

1985 births
Living people
Italian male cyclists
Cyclists from Milan
21st-century Italian people